Matías Ruben Conti (born 17 January 1990) is an Argentine professional footballer who plays as a striker for Malaysia Super League club Negeri Sembilan.

He was born on January 17, 1990. Son of Alice and Ruben, with three siblings, he lives in same village to Gabriel Batistuta, who Conti refer him as his idol. Conti begins to chart a path that can lead to the first in a short time. Protagonist highlight of the fourth division in the first months of 2009 where he scored 10 goals, the striker Santa Fe began to be called up reserves and start of second season he was called up for his first preseason with the first team.

Club career

Vélez Sarsfield
Conti began his club career in top Argentina Primera División, Vélez Sarsfield. In the 2009–10 season he made his professional debut in the Argentine Primera División on 14 December 2009, when Vélez Sarsfield vs Rosario Central. He played 4 match before he was loaned to Deportivo Merlo for 2010–2011. He scored 1 goal in 14 matches.

Deportivo Merlo 
After an impressive season with Deportivo Merlo, Conti transferred to Deportivo Merlo for 2011–2012 season. He scored first goal for the club on 27 May 2012, against Gimnasia La Plata. After the 2011–2012 season finished, he joined Tristán Suárez.

Tristán Suárez 
He made his debut on 6 August, appearing as a substitute in a 0–2 loss against San Telmo, and made his first start for the club in the game against Barracas Central On 9 September 2012, he scored his first goal for Tristán Suárez in the 33rd minute against Deportivo Laferrere. He made 20 appearances with Tristán Suárez before he agreed to join Pahang FA in Malaysia Super League.

Sri Pahang F.C. 
On 8 April 2013, Conti had a trial with Malaysia Super League side Sri Pahang to fill foreign player quota after Pahang had already signed Jamaican player, Damion Stewart earlier on. He scored 5 goals in friendly match against Shahzan Muda FC. On his debut, he scored a brace that put Pahang into Malaysia FA Cup semi-finals. On 3 November 2013, Conti scored the winner against Kelantan in a narrow 1–0 win in the Malaysia Cup final, which was the clubs first Malaysia Cup in 21-years.

In December 2013, Matias Conti confirmed that he will stay at Pahang for another season, ending speculation of the Argentine accepting a contract with a Spanish club.

Honours

Clubs
Pahang
 Malaysia FA Cup : 2014
 Malaysia Cup : 2013, 2014
 Malaysia Charity Shield: 2014

References

External links
Man of the moment
Conti 'degil'
Ada 90 minit lagi: Conti
Striker Conti wins Dollah's heart
Sad exit for Pahang
Conti’s return a big boost for Elephants
Conti, Fauzi julang Tok Gajah
Conti mula pamer taring
Conti, Stewart tipped to boost Pahang title bid
Johor DT and Pahang hit paydirt with Argentine signings

1990 births
Living people
People from Reconquista, Santa Fe
Argentine footballers
Club Atlético Vélez Sarsfield footballers
Deportivo Merlo footballers
CSyD Tristán Suárez footballers
Sri Pahang FC players
Universidad de Concepción footballers
Club Sportivo Estudiantes players
Borneo F.C. players
Deportivo Armenio footballers
Club Atlético Fénix players
Al-Ramtha SC players
Chilean Primera División players
Malaysia Super League players
Expatriate footballers in Chile
Expatriate footballers in Malaysia
Expatriate footballers in Jordan
Argentine expatriate sportspeople in Chile
Argentine expatriate sportspeople in Malaysia
Argentine expatriate sportspeople in Jordan
Association football forwards
Sportspeople from Santa Fe Province